Between Pancho Villa and a Naked Woman is a 1996 Mexican comedy film directed by Sabina Berman and Isabelle Tardán. The film was selected as the Mexican entry for the Best Foreign Language Film at the 69th Academy Awards, but was not accepted as a nominee.

Cast
 Diana Bracho as Gina López
 Arturo Ríos as Adrián Pineda
 Jesús Ochoa as Pancho Villa

See also
 List of submissions to the 69th Academy Awards for Best Foreign Language Film
 List of Mexican submissions for the Academy Award for Best Foreign Language Film

References

External links
 

1996 films
1996 comedy films
1990s Spanish-language films
Mexican comedy films
1990s Mexican films